The Red Siren is a 2002 French crime thriller film based upon the novel by same name by Maurice G. Dantec. The film was directed by Olivier Megaton from a script by Olivier Megaton, Alain Berliner, Norman Spinrad, and Robert Conrath.

Plot
The film tells the story of Alice (Alexandra Negrão) who confesses to a detective named Anita (Asia Argento) that her mother Eva (Frances Barber) is a dangerous killer. Eva is also a very powerful and wealthy leader of a vast crime syndicate. She discovers that her daughter met with the police and tries to stop her. Unbeknownst at first to both Anita and Eva, Alice escapes from France and leaves for Portugal to reunite with her supposedly dead father.  Eva's henchmen chase after her.  Alice meets a mercenary while escaping, Hugo (Jean-Marc Barr), who then joins Alice as her protector on her journey to find her father.  Anita travels after her, as well.  After Eva's henchmen close in, Eva reappears to "reclaim" her daughter.

Cast
 Jean-Marc Barr as Hugo (full name is "Hugo Cornelius Toorop" in La Sirène Rouge novel)
 Asia Argento as Detective Anita Staro
 Frances Barber as Eva
 Alexandra Negrão as Alice
 Andrew Tiernan as Koesler
 Edouard Montoute as Oliveira
 Vernon Dobtcheff as Vitali
 Johan Leysen as Travis
 Jean-Christophe Bouvet as Lucas
 François Levantal as Sorvan
  as Vondt

References

External links
 
 
 
Review on Variety.com

2002 films
2002 action thriller films
2000s French-language films
2000s English-language films
French action thriller films
French crime thriller films
2002 crime thriller films
Films directed by Olivier Megaton
English-language French films
2000s French films